The 2012 New Hampshire Wildcats football team represented the University of New Hampshire in the 2012 NCAA Division I FCS football season. They were led by 14th-year head coach Sean McDonnell and played their home games at Cowell Stadium. They are a member of the Colonial Athletic Association. They finished the season 8–4, 6–2 in CAA play. Due to Old Dominion (7–1 in CAA play) being ineligible for the CAA title, the Wildcats finished in a four way tie for the CAA championship. They received an at-large bid into the FCS playoffs where they lost in the second round to Wofford.

Schedule

Source: Schedule

Ranking movements

References

New Hampshire
New Hampshire Wildcats football seasons
Colonial Athletic Association football champion seasons
New Hampshire
New Hampshire Wildcats football